Charlie Rubin is an American television comedy writer, producer, and humorist.

He has written for National Lampoon, The Carol Burnett Show, In Living Color, The Jon Stewart Show, Saturday Night Live, Seinfeld, and Law & Order: Criminal Intent.

Rubin attended Horace Mann School in Riverdale, New York and then Williams College, from which he graduated in 1972.  While at Williams, Rubin, along with his friend, Mitchell Rapoport, founded The Williams Advocate. He also produced an original musical called "Sizzle" with William Finn at the Adams Memorial Theater. It was the first original musical to be mounted at Williams College since Stephen Sondheim attended over 20 years earlier.

Rubin is a professor at NYU's Tisch School of the Arts in the Rita & Burton Goldberg Department of Dramatic Writing, where he teaches writing for television.

He married writer Susan Shapiro on July 27, 1996.

References

External links

Living people
American television writers
American male television writers
New York University faculty
Screenwriters from New York (state)
Year of birth missing (living people)